The 1888 Melbourne Cup was a two-mile handicap horse race which took place on Tuesday, 6 November 1888.

This year was the twenty-eighth running of the Melbourne Cup. This year the VRC lifted the sweepstakes for the Melbourne Cup making the Cup the most valuable race in the world at the time. This was the first of four Melbourne Cup wins for trainor Walter Hickenbotham.

This is the list of placegetters for the 1888 Melbourne Cup.

See also

 Melbourne Cup
 List of Melbourne Cup winners
 Victoria Racing Club
 Australian Racing Hall of Fame

References

External links
1888 Melbourne Cup footyjumpers.com

1888
Melbourne Cup
Melbourne Cup
19th century in Melbourne
1880s in Melbourne